The Astoria Fire House No. 2, also known originally as the North Pacific Brewing Company Beer Storage Building and as the Uppertown Firefighter's Museum since 1989, is a historic building located in Astoria, Oregon, United States.

The fire house was listed on the National Register of Historic Places in 1984.

The Uppertown Firefighter's Museum is operated by the Clatsop County Historical Society.  The museum features fire-fighting equipment from 1879 to 1963, hand-pulled, horse-drawn, and motorized fire engines, fire fighting memorabilia and photos.

See also
National Register of Historic Places listings in Clatsop County, Oregon

References

External links
Uppertown Firefighter's Museum - Clatsop County Historical Society

1896 establishments in Oregon
Defunct fire stations in Oregon
Fire stations completed in 1929
Firefighting museums in the United States
Fire stations on the National Register of Historic Places in Oregon
Industrial buildings and structures on the National Register of Historic Places in Oregon
Museums in Astoria, Oregon
National Register of Historic Places in Astoria, Oregon